Gavin Ernest Royfee (born 20 February 1929) is a former New Zealand cricketer who played three matches of first-class cricket for Canterbury in the 1952–53 season.

An opening batsman, Gavin Royfee scored 41 and 15 on his first-class debut against Auckland, but was unsuccessful in his next two matches. He played for 16 years for Lancaster Park-Woolston in the Christchurch competition, scoring more than 4000 runs.

Royfee attended Cathedral Grammar School in Christchurch, and later returned to the school to work as its bursar.

References

External links

 Gavin Royfee at CricketArchive

1929 births
Living people
New Zealand cricketers
Canterbury cricketers
Cricketers from Christchurch